Ramgarh Coalfield are located in Ramgarh district in the Indian state of Jharkhand.

Overview
In 1917, L.S.S.O’Malley described the coalfields in the upper reaches of the Damodar as follows: “Near the western boundary of Jharia field is that of Bokaro, covering , with an estimated content of 1,500 million tons; close by is the Ramgarh field of (40 square miles), but the coal is believed to be of inferior quality.

The Coalfield

Reserves
Geological reserves in the Ramgarh Coalfield in million tonnes as on 1/4/2010:

Projects

Transport
In 1927, Bengal Nagpur Railway opened the  Barkakana-Muri-Chandil line to traffic. In the same year the Central India Coalfields Railway opened the Gomoh-Barkakana line. It was extended to Daltonganj in 1929. Later, these lines were amalgamated with East Indian Railway.

References

See also 
Ramgarh district

Coalfields of India
Mining in Jharkhand
Ramgarh district